was the first Japanese person to officially immigrate to Canada.

Biography
Manzo Nagano emigrated from Japan to Canada in 1877, arriving in New Westminster, British Columbia. He became a salmon fisherman working in the Fraser River and later moved to Vancouver to load timber onto ships. He returned to Japan briefly in 1884, then moved to the American city of Seattle, Washington, to open a tobacco and restaurant business. He returned to Canada in 1892 to open a hotel and store, amongst other businesses. He lost all his possessions in a fire in 1922 and moved back to Japan, where he died a year later. 

The Canadian Mount Manzo Nagano, near Owikeno Lake, BC, was officially named in his honour, to commemorate the arrival of Japanese immigrants to Canada.

The figure skater Keegan Messing is his great-great-grandson.

Notes

References
 Mori, Kenzo and Hiroto Takami. (1977). Kanada no Manzo Monogatari: The First Immigrant to Canada. Tokyo: Suzuyama Shobo.

External links
 Famous Canadians

1855 births
1923 deaths
Japanese emigrants to Canada
People from Nagasaki Prefecture